Ahmadiyya in Israel is a small Muslim community in Israel. The Community was first established in the region in the 1920s, in what was then the British Mandate of Palestine. Israel is the only country in the Middle East where the Ahmadi branch of Islam can be openly practiced. As such, Kababir, a neighbourhood on Mount Carmel in Haifa, Israel, acts as the Middle East headquarters of the Community. It is unknown how many Israeli Ahmadis there are, although it is estimated there are about 2,200 Ahmadis in Kababir alone.

History
The history of the Ahmadiyya Community in Israel begins with a tour of the Middle East in 1924 made by the second caliph of the Community Mirza Basheer-ud-Din Mahmood Ahmad and a number of missionaries. However, the Community was first established in the region in 1928, in what was then the British Mandate of Palestine. The first converts to the movement belonged to the Odeh tribe on Carmel Mount (tribe originated from Ni'lin a small village near Jerusalem). In the 1950s, they settled in Kababir, formerly a village which was later absorbed by the city of Haifa. The neighbourhood's first mosque was built in 1931, and a larger Mahmood Mosque in the 1980s.

In 1987, the Israeli Ahmadiyya Community translated the Quran into Yiddish, a language among the 100 languages chosen by the then caliph of the Community, Mirza Tahir Ahmad.

Modern community
The Ahmadiyya Community is present in most districts of Israel, but is generally concentrated in Israel's third largest city, Haifa.

Haifa

Although there are many Ahmadis in other parts of Israel, the neighbourhood of Kababir in Haifa is the only established community in Israel. Kababir is a mixed neighbourhood, with an Ahmadiyya majority, a significant minority of Jews, some Christians and a few Druze. The community includes a small number of Palestinian immigrants who sought shelter in Haifa, after they were excommunicated by their larger families in the West Bank. Haifa city officials view it as a model of coexistence. Yona Yahav, a past Mayor of Haifa has described the local Ahmadis as "Reform Arabs" (in analogy with Reform Jews). Multiple politicians have visited the local Community, including the then President of Israel, Shimon Peres on invitation for an Iftar dinner during the month of Ramadhan.

The local Ahmadi community is an active contributor in the life of the city, such as participation in interfaith activities, for instance in the Haifa Forum for Interfaith Cooperation. Ahmadi Muslims organize an annual neighbours day to in order to promote good relations with its neighbours and to introduce the Ahmadiyya Community. The Community also plays a significant role in the Holiday of Holidays, a local festival attended by tens of thousands of people. Ahmadi leaders and members participate in all the symbolic and official ceremonies and gatherings, together with other religious and political leaders with whom it maintains serene and active relations.

In 2009, as part of the official delegation of renowned Israeli religious leaders, the president of the Ahmadiyya Muslim Community of Israel met Pope Benedict XVI, to deliver a direct message composed by the fifth Caliph of the Community, Mirza Masroor Ahmad. The Pope was also given a copy of the Quran in this occasion. In 2011, the local Ahmadi community hosted a tour of the city and the local mosque for the 27th annual International Mayors Conference, an event sponsored by the American Council for World Jewry in cooperation with the Israeli Ministry of Foreign Affairs.

As the regional headquarters of the Community, in the only country in the Middle East that permits Ahmadi Muslims to practice their faith freely, the Haifa community hosts an annual conference for Ahmadi religious leaders from various parts of the world, particularly Middle Eastern countries, such as Jordan, Egypt and Palestine. The Haifa community is also a host to a number of television programmes for its Arabic viewers in the Middle East and North Africa, through its Arabic television channel MTA 3, which is part of the MTA International global television network.

Rest of Israel
Ahmadis have a presence in the Southern District, the Central District, the Northern District and the Jerusalem District in Israel. However, there is no established community in any of these regions.

See also

Islam in Israel

References

Israel
Islam in Israel
Ethnic groups in the Middle East